In Japanese,  describes a higashi (dry Japanese confectionery) that is made out of rice. Major types include:
 senbei
 okaki
 arare
 kaki no tane

Some types of senbei may use wheat flour or barley flour instead of rice flour, for example tansan senbei, nanbu senbei and kawara senbei.

See also
 Japanese cuisine
 List of crackers
 List of Japanese desserts and sweets

References

 
Japanese desserts and sweets